Lieutenant-General Sir Antony Ernest Wentworth Harman  (21 April 1872 – 26 September 1961) was an Anglo-Irish British Army officer who commanded 1st Division.

Military career

Harman was commissioned into the Limerick City Artillery (Southern Division) in 1891 before transferring to the 3rd Dragoon Guards in January 1894. He was promoted to Captain on 1 April 1900, and seconded to serve with the Army Service Corps. In May 1902 he was temporary appointed a Staff captain.

He served in the First World War joining the British Expeditionary Force and taking part in the action at Néry in 1914 before becoming Commandant of the Cavalry School at Netheravon. He was appointed Commandant of the 1st Cavalry Brigade in 1920, Colonel in charge of Administration at Northern Command in 1924 and Commandant of the Equitation School and Inspector of Cavalry in 1926. He went on to be General Officer Commanding 1st Division at Aldershot in 1930 before retiring in 1934.

He was also Colonel of the Queen's Bays (2nd Dragoon Guards). He is buried at Marnhull Churchyard in Dorset.

Family

In 1902 he married Dorothy Ricardo; they had two daughters and a son (General Sir Jack Harman).

References

1872 births
1961 deaths
Burials in Dorset
Military personnel from County Cork
British Army lieutenant generals
People from County Cork
British Army cavalry generals of World War I
Irish knights
Knights Commander of the Order of the Bath
Companions of the Distinguished Service Order
2nd Dragoon Guards (Queen's Bays) officers
3rd Dragoon Guards officers